Under Fire: The Story of a Squad (French: Le Feu: journal d'une escouade) by Henri Barbusse (December 1916), was one of the first novels about World War I to be published. Although it is fiction, the novel was based on Barbusse's experiences as a French soldier on the Western Front. It was awarded the Prix Goncourt in 1916.

Summary and style

The novel takes the form of journal-like anecdotes which the unnamed narrator claims to be writing to record his time in the war. It follows a squad of French Poilu on the Western front in France after the German invasion. According to Winter, "His intention was to tell the story of a single squad, men from all over France, men of little learning but much generosity of spirit." The anecdotes are episodic, each with a chapter title. The chapter, "Fire" describes a trench assault from the Allied (French) trench across No-Man's Land into the German trench.  Barbusse wrote, "Fully conscious of what they are doing, fully fit and in good health, they have massed there to throw themselves once more into that madman's role that is imposed on each of them by the folly of the human race."

Publication and reception

Barbusse wrote Le feu while he was a serving soldier. He claimed to have taken notes for the novel while still in the trenches; after being injured and reassigned from the front, he wrote and published the novel while working at the War Office in 1916.

Winter states, "Under Fire was a phenomenal success. The first in the line of such moral witnesses in the twentieth century were soldier-poets and novelists of the Great War. And the first among them was Henri Barbusse." The work was first published in serial form in L'Oeuvre, which enabled Barbusse to bypass the censors.  Jacques Bertillon wrote to Barbusse in praise, "It is a masterpiece. It is a document which will remain as a witness [témoin] to this war...."

Like many war novels, Under Fire was criticised for fictionalizing details of the war. In 1929, Jean Norton Cru, who was commissioned to critique French literature of World War I, called Under Fire'' "a concoction of truth, half-truth, and total falsehood."

The novel was first published in French in December 1916. It was translated into English by William Fitzwater Wray and published in June 1917 by J. M. Dent & Sons. In 2003, Penguin Press published a new translation by Robin Buss with an introduction by the American historian Jay Winter.

In Robert Graves' autobiography "Good-Bye to All That" he mentions that, during the war, British pacifists urged Siegfried Sassoon to write "something red-hot in the style of Barbusse's "Under Fire" but he couldn't do it."

Book sales were used to create the ARAC (Association Républicaine des Anciens Combattants).

References

External links
Under Fire, scanned books from Internet Archive, Google Books and Project Gutenberg
Under Fire:the story of a squad, English translation by Fitzwater Wray at Project Gutenberg
Under Fire, HTML edition
 

1917 French novels
Novels set during World War I
Personal accounts of World War I
Prix Goncourt winning works